Vilkhivka may refer to the following places in Ukraine:

Vilkhivka, Chernihiv Oblast
Vilkhivka, Donetsk Oblast
Vilkhivka, Ivano-Frankivsk Oblast
Vilkhivka, Kharkiv Oblast
Vilkhivka, Rivne Oblast
Vilkhivka, Volyn Oblast